In mathematics, the Liouville–Neumann series is an infinite series that corresponds to the resolvent formalism technique of solving the Fredholm integral equations in Fredholm theory.

Definition
The Liouville–Neumann (iterative) series is defined as

which, provided that  is small enough so that the series converges, is the unique continuous solution of the Fredholm integral equation of the second kind,

If the nth iterated kernel is defined as n−1 nested integrals of n operators ,

then

with

so K0  may be taken to be .

The resolvent (or solving kernel for the integral operator) is then given by a schematic analog "geometric series",

where K0 has been taken to be .

The solution of the integral equation thus becomes simply

Similar methods may be used to solve the Volterra equations.

See also
Neumann series

References
 Mathews, Jon; Walker, Robert L. (1970), Mathematical methods of physics (2nd ed.), New York: W. A. Benjamin, 
 

Fredholm theory
Mathematical series
Mathematical physics